The Secret Life of Japan season of television programmes and films was shown on Channel 4, in the United Kingdom, between Saturday 30 December 2000, and Tuesday 9 January 2001.

Programmes and films

References

External links
The TV Room - Idents & Animations

Channel 4 original programming